In mathematics, the special linear group  of degree n over a field F is the set of  matrices with determinant 1, with the group operations of ordinary matrix multiplication and matrix inversion. This is the normal subgroup of the general linear group given by the kernel of the determinant

where F× is the multiplicative group of F (that is, F excluding 0).

These elements are "special" in that they form an algebraic subvariety of the general linear group – they satisfy a polynomial equation (since the determinant is polynomial in the entries).

When F is a finite field of order q, the notation  is sometimes used.

Geometric interpretation
The special linear group  can be characterized as the group of volume and orientation preserving linear transformations of Rn; this corresponds to the interpretation of the determinant as measuring change in volume and orientation.

Lie subgroup
The Lie algebra  of SL(n, F) consists of all  matrices over F with vanishing trace. The Lie bracket is given by the commutator.

Topology
Any invertible matrix can be uniquely represented according to the polar decomposition as the product of a unitary matrix and a hermitian matrix with positive eigenvalues. The determinant of the unitary matrix is on the unit circle while that of the hermitian matrix is real and positive and since in the case of a matrix from the special linear group the product of these two determinants must be 1, then each of them must be 1. Therefore, a special linear matrix can be written as the product of a special unitary matrix (or special orthogonal matrix in the real case) and a positive definite hermitian matrix (or symmetric matrix in the real case) having determinant 1.

Thus the topology of the group  is the product of the topology of SU(n) and the topology of the group of hermitian matrices of unit determinant with positive eigenvalues. A hermitian matrix of unit determinant and having positive eigenvalues can be uniquely expressed as the exponential of a traceless hermitian matrix, and therefore the topology of this is that of -dimensional Euclidean space. Since SU(n) is simply connected, we conclude that  is also simply connected, for all n.

Since the latter matrices can be uniquely expressed as the exponential of symmetric traceless matrices, then this latter topology is that of -dimensional Euclidean space. In particular this means that , unlike , is not simply connected, for n greater than 1.

Relations to other subgroups of GL(n,A)

Two related subgroups, which in some cases coincide with SL, and in other cases are accidentally conflated with SL, are the commutator subgroup of GL, and the group generated by transvections. These are both subgroups of SL (transvections have determinant 1, and det is a map to an abelian group, so [GL, GL] ≤ SL), but in general do not coincide with it.

For , transvections need not be commutators (of  matrices), as seen for example when A is F2, the field of two elements, then 

where Alt(3) and Sym(3) denote the alternating resp. symmetric group on 3 letters.

However, if A is a field with more than 2 elements, then , and if A is a field with more than 3 elements, . 

In some circumstances these coincide: the special linear group over a field or a Euclidean domain is generated by transvections, and the stable special linear group over a Dedekind domain is generated by transvections. For more general rings the stable difference is measured by the special Whitehead group , where SL(A) and E(A) are the stable groups of the special linear group and elementary matrices.

Generators and relations
If working over a ring where SL is generated by transvections (such as a field or Euclidean domain), one can give a presentation of SL using transvections with some relations. Transvections satisfy the Steinberg relations, but these are not sufficient: the resulting group is the Steinberg group, which is not the special linear group, but rather the universal central extension of the commutator subgroup of GL.

Let (1) be the elementary matrix with 1's on the diagonal and in the ij position, and 0's elsewhere (and i ≠ j). Then

are a complete set of relations for SL(n, Z), n ≥ 3.

SL±(n,F)
In characteristic other than 2, the set of matrices with determinant  form another subgroup of GL, with SL as an index 2 subgroup (necessarily normal); in characteristic 2 this is the same as SL. This forms a short exact sequence of groups:

Structure of GL(n,F)

GL(n, F) = SL(n, F) ⋊ F×.

See also
 SL(2, R)
 SL(2, C)
 Modular group
 Projective linear group
 Conformal map
 Representations of classical Lie groups

References

Linear algebra
Lie groups
Linear algebraic groups